Ntcham, or Basari, is a language of the Gurma people in Togo and Ghana. Akaselem (Tchamba) is frequently listed as a separate language.

Writing System 

Long vowels are indicated by doubling the letter ‹aa, ii, ɔɔ, uu› and two vowels are always long ‹ee, oo›.
The tones are represented by acute accents for high tone and grave accents for low tone, on the vowels and the consonants m, n, b, l : ‹ḿ, ń, b́, ĺ›, ‹m̀, ǹ, b̀, l̀›.

References

Languages of Togo
Gurma languages
Languages of Ghana